Marino Zorzato (born 10 May 1956, in Cittadella) is an Italian politician from Veneto.

A long-time Christian Democrat, Zorzato was elected to the Italian Chamber of Deputies for Forza Italia in 2001, 2006 and 2006. Having Forza Italia merged into The People of Freedom in 2008, Zorzato became deputy regional coordinator of the new party.

In the 2010 regional election Zorzato formed the ticket with Luca Zaia and was elected to the Regional Council of Veneto from Zaia's regional list. Subsequently, he was appointed Vice President of Veneto and regional minister of Culture in Zaia I Government.

In the 2015 regional election Zorzato, who had joined the New Centre-Right (rebranded New Centre-Right Autonomous Veneto at the Venetian level), was re-elected to the Regional Council and served a second full term, this time in the minority.

Having joined the new Forza Italia in 2019, Zorzato did not stand for re-election in 2020.

References

Members of the Chamber of Deputies (Italy)
Forza Italia politicians
The People of Freedom politicians
21st-century Italian politicians
People from the Province of Padua
1956 births
Living people
Members of the Regional Council of Veneto